Ballard F. Smith (born 1946) is a former president of the San Diego Padres major league baseball franchise.  A graduate of Carleton College and the University of Minnesota Law School, Smith was a district attorney in Pennsylvania before taking over the Padres in 1979 during the time his father-in-law Ray Kroc owned the team.  He led the Padres to the 1984 National League Championship and served on the executive committee of Major League Baseball from 1984 to 1987.  He also served on the board of directors of the McDonald's Corporation from 1983 to 1997.  Smith subsequently moved to Idaho and to other business interests and activities.

In 2013, Smith co-founded an educational non-profit called Science of Sport  with University of Arizona Professor Ricardo Valerdi  aimed at promoting STEM education through sports examples.  Smith serves as executive director  for the non-profit which has established educational programs for the San Diego Padres, Los Angeles Angels of Anaheim, Arizona Diamondbacks, Colorado Rockies, and Washington Nationals.

References 

1946 births
Living people
Pennsylvania lawyers
Glenbrook North High School alumni
Carleton College alumni
University of Minnesota Law School alumni
San Diego Padres executives